Ivan Melezh (Belarusian: Іван Паўлавіч Мележ; 8 February 1921, Hlinischy, Homiel Voblast — 9 August 1976, Minsk) was a Belarusian writer of fiction and drama.

Biography
He was born to a peasant family. He was seriously injured in 1942 and was moved to the rear following his recovery.

Initially, he lived in Buguruslan, then studied at Baku State University. He later taught Belarusian literature at Belarusan State University in Minsk. From 1945, he was a member of the Union of Soviet Writers, serving as Secretary after 1966 and Deputy Chairman from 1971 to 1974. From 1967 to 1976, he was a Deputy to the Supreme Soviet.   

He was designated a People's Writer of the Belarusian SSR in 1972 and was awarded numerous prizes, including the Lenin prize for his novels People of the Marsh («Людзі на балоце») and The Storm's Breath («Подых навальніцы»).

The central place in Melezh's work is made up by the novels of the Polesye Chronicle («Палеская хроніка»): People of the Marsh, The Storm's Breath and Snowstorm in December («Завеі, снежань»). These novels portray the life in his homeland in the 1920s and 1930s: the establishment of socialism, forced collectivization, and dekulakization. Melezh attempted  to depict the history of this era truthfully, within the constraints imposed by the Soviet regime.

Novels
 «Мінскі напрамак» (The Minsk Line of Advance)(1952/1974)
 «Палеская хроніка» (Polesie Chronicles):
 «Людзі на балоце» (1962)
 «Подых навальніцы» (1966)
 «Завеі, снежань» (1978)

Films based on Melezh's works
 «Дыхание грозы» (1981, directed by )
 «Люди на болоте» (1981, directed by Viktor Turov)

External links

  A short overview
  Some of Melezh's works online
  Ivan Melezh: Writer versus Time
  Ivan Melezh virtual museum

1921 births
1976 deaths
People from Chojniki District
Members of the Supreme Soviet of the Byelorussian SSR (1967–1970)
Members of the Supreme Soviet of the Byelorussian SSR (1971–1974)
Members of the Supreme Soviet of the Byelorussian SSR (1975–1979)
Belarusian writers
Belarusian State University alumni
Soviet military personnel of World War II
People's Writers of the Byelorussian SSR
Lenin Prize winners
Soviet writers